Matsunaga Danjo Hisahide (松永 弾正 久秀 1508 – November 19, 1577) was a daimyō and head of the Yamato Matsunaga clan in Japan during the Sengoku period of the 16th century.

Biography
He was a retainer of Miyoshi Nagayoshi from the 1540s. He directed the conquest of the province of Yamato in the 1560s and by 1564 had built a sufficient power base to be effectively independent. It is believed that he was conspiring against Nagayoshi during this period; from 1561 to 1563 three of Nagayoshi's brothers and his son, Yoshiaki, died. This left Miyoshi Yoshitsugu the adopted heir when Nagayoshi died in 1564, too young to rule. Three men shared his guardianship – Miyoshi Nagayuki, Miyoshi Masayasu, and Iwanari Tomomichi.

He then invaded the shōgun Ashikaga Yoshiteru's palace, who then committed suicide.

His brother Ashikaga Yoshiaki fled and the shōgun was replaced by his young cousin, Yoshihide. 

In 1566, fighting started between Hisahide and Miyoshi. Initially, the forces of Hisahide were unsuccessful and his apparent destruction of the Buddhist Tōdai-ji in Nara was considered an act of infamy.

In 1568 Oda Nobunaga, with the figurehead Yoshiaki, attacked Hisahide. Nobunaga captured Kyoto in November and Hisahide was forced to submit.

Yoshiaki was made shōgun, a post he held only until 1573 when he attempted to remove himself from Nobunaga's power. Hisahide kept control of the Yamato and served Nobunaga in his extended campaigns against the Miyoshi and others, for a while. In 1573 Hisahide briefly allied with the Miyoshi, but when the hope for success was not achieved he returned to Nobunaga to fight the Miyoshi.

In 1577 Nobunaga besieged him at Shigisan Castle. Defeated but defiant Hisahide committed suicide.  A noted tea master, he destroyed his tea bowl denying it to his enemies.

He ordered his head destroyed to prevent it from becoming a trophy (in which his son, Matsunaga Kojiro grabbed Hisahide's head and jumped off the castle wall with his sword through his throat). His son, Hisamichi, also committed suicide in the siege.

Hisahide often appears as a shriveled and scheming old man.

Honours
Senior Fourth Rank, Lower Grade (conferred on January 4, 1561)

In popular culture
See People of the Sengoku period in popular culture.

Matsunaga Danjo Hisahide is featured as a character in Sengoku Basara 2: Heroes, in which he is depicted as a man of treachery who enjoys any course of action that would subsequently present to him a greater sum of pleasure. He takes a primary role in Katakura Kojūrō's story, and by the end of such a scenario, he sets aflame his initial base with explosives as a showing of defeat. Hisahide was announced as one of 14 characters to be made playable in the upcoming expansion to Sengoku Basara: Samurai Heroes.
Hisahide Matsunaga appears as a character in the Samurai Warriors series. Prior to becoming playable in Samurai Warriors 4, Matsunaga appeared as a "fire ninja" bodyguard character in Samurai Warriors 2 and later reappeared in Samurai Warriors 3 as a generic non-playable character. Following his aforementioned playable debut, Matsunaga also appeared as a playable character in Warriors Orochi 4.
In Samurai Warriors 5, Matsunaga returns as a playable character voiced by Kouji Ishii.
in Sengoku Basara, he also appears during the challenge, involving his mercenaries to destroy two gates. If the player repulsed all attempts, he appears. If failed, he was shown waving his sword as it explodes. He excels in sword fights, mixing it with his fascination with explosives and fire-based techniques.
In The Ambition of Oda Nobuna, Matsunaga Hisahide is played by a girl who is also known as the Venomous Scorpion. She is a co-conspirator of the Miyoshi Three who removed the Ashikaga Shogunate from power but later betrays them and is eventually forced out of Kyoto by Oda. She is the Daimyo of the Yamato Province and a notorious turncoat, frequently allying herself with one group, betraying them, manipulating them, and rejoining them at her convenience. Matsunaga Hisahide is voiced by Masumi Asano in Japanese and by Shelley Calene-Black in English.
In the 2014 anime Nobunaga Concerto, and its 2015 film adaptation, Matsunaga Hisahide is depicted as a Yakuza member before being transported to the past, Hisahide relishes the chaos of the Sengoku period, believing it to be a battle where only the strongest win. Meeting Nobunaga after his rejection of the Shogun's letter to attack the Oda, Hisahide offers his loose loyalty to Nobunaga until the time he can rebel. In the anime, he is voiced by Takaya Kuroda and played by Arata Furuta in the film adaption.
In the 2014 Taiga drama, Gunshi Kanbei, Matsunaga Danjo Hisahide is played by actor Mickey Curtis.
In the 2020 anime television series Oda Cinnamon Nobunaga, voiced by Ryūsei Nakao. Reincarnated as a chihuahua in modern-day Japan.
In the 2020 Taiga drama, Kirin ga Kuru, Matsunaga Hisahide is played by actor Kōtarō Yoshida. This Taiga's narrative was that Hisahide left his alliance with Nobunaga after Tsutsui Junkei, his rival, was chosen as the protector of the Yamata Province. Nobunaga's son, Oda Nobutada, with Akechi Mitsuhide, would defeat Hisahide at the Siege of Shigisan. If Hisahide had surrendered, Nobunaga would have given him a small fiefdom.
In Nioh, Matsunaga Hisahide makes an appearance in the game and is shown as a spirit residing in an ethereal teapot and referring to himself as "Danjo". 
In Nioh 2, Matsunaga Hisahide appears in the main storyline and within the game's events, he dies and serves the same purpose as the game before it.

References

1508 births
1577 deaths
Daimyo
Matsunaga clan
Miyoshi clan
Samurai
Yamato Province